Valerie Hernández Matías (born July 19, 1993, in San Juan) is a Puerto Rican model and beauty queen who was crowned Miss International 2014 in Tokyo, Japan. She is the second winner from Puerto Rico after Laurie Simpson in 1987.

Pageantry

Miss Teen International 2012
Hernández was crowned Miss Teen International in 2012, she was the fourth Puerto Rican to obtain this title.

Miss International Puerto Rico 2014
Valerie competed in Miss International Puerto Rico 2014 where she finished as the first runner-up. She later assumed the title after the original winner, Patricia Quiñones, resigned for personal reasons.

Miss International 2014
In 2014, Hernandez represented Puerto Rico at Miss International where she won the title, becoming the second Puerto Rican to win after Laurie Simpson in 1987.

Miss Universe Puerto Rico 2018
On May 31, 2018, Hernandez was designated as Miss Carolina Universe and was initially set to compete at Miss Universe Puerto Rico 2018 for a chance to represent the island at Miss Universe 2018 but withdrew due to personal issues.

References

1993 births
Living people
Puerto Rican beauty pageant winners
Miss International 2014 delegates
Miss International winners
People from San Juan, Puerto Rico